The A1 or EX-A1 is a  motorway in Extremadura, connecting Navalmoral de la Mata and Moraleja. , plans to extend the motorway to the Portuguese border at Termas de Montfortinho are on hold.

References

Autopistas and autovías in Spain